The LoPresti Fury is a prototype sports plane built in the United States in the late 1980s. It is a fast two-seat low wing tail dragger, based on the Globe Swift and made of sheet aluminum. The current engine is a Lycoming IO-360-A1B6, giving the Fury a max speed of 222 mph. The aircraft will carry two adults with up to 100 pounds of baggage and has a range of 1000 miles.

Originally designed by Roy LoPresti while working at LoPresti Piper Aircraft Engineering Company, he eventually secured rights to the design following the bankruptcy of the company.

Operational history
The aircraft was displayed at Sun 'n Fun in 1989 as the SwiftFury. Over 500 orders were placed for the aircraft prior to Piper's bankruptcy in 1991.

Specifications (prototype, converted Swift)

References

 Manufacturer's website
 
 
  
 

1980s United States sport aircraft